Natalya Shevtsova (born December 17, 1974) was a professional sprinter from Russia. She won a bronze medal at the 2001 IAAF World Championships in the 4x400 m relay event by virtue of running for her team in the preliminary rounds.

She also came in fourth place at the 2001 Goodwill Games in the same event, this time running in the final.

Major international competitions

Domestic competitions

References 

Living people
1974 births
Russian female sprinters
Competitors at the 2001 Goodwill Games